Thandwe ("Thandway" in Arakanese;  ; formerly Sandoway) is a town and major seaport in Rakhine State, the westernmost part of Myanmar. Thandwe is very ancient, and is said to have been at one time the capital of Rakhine State, then called Arakan. The area is mountainous, and spurs of the Arakan Mountains reach the coast. The streams are only mountain torrents to within a few miles of the coast; the mouth of the Khwa forms a good anchorage for small boats. The rocks in the Arakan Range and its spurs are metamorphic, and include clay, slates, ironstone and indurated sandstone; towards the south, ironstone, trap and rocks of basaltic character are common; veins of steatite and white fibrous quartz are also found. Nearby Ngapali Beach is popular among tourists.

Climate
Thandwe has a tropical monsoon climate (Köppen climate classification Am). Temperatures are very warm throughout the year. There is a winter dry season (November–April) and a summer wet season (May–October). Torrential rain falls from June to September, with over  falling in each of the months of June, July and August.

References

External links

 18° 28' 0" North, 94° 22' 0" East Satellite map at Maplandia.com

Populated places in Rakhine State
Beaches of Myanmar
Tourist attractions in Myanmar
Township capitals of Myanmar